The Consulate General of Russia in Isfahan, Iran was built during the Qajar dynasty and is registered on the Iran National Heritage List.

History
Councilor Petr Egorovich Panafidin was appointed as the first Consul General on February 18, 1897.

Diplomats
Consul General Mr. Boris Burmistrov

Function
Consulate administrates visa issues.

References

Iran
Russia
Iran–Russia relations
Infobox mapframe without OSM relation ID on Wikidata
Buildings of the Qajar period
National works of Iran